Tămășești may refer to several places in Romania:

 Tămășești, a village in Bălești, Gorj County
 Tămășești, a village in Zam Commune, Hunedoara County
 Tămășești, a village in Ariniș Commune, Maramureș County
 Tămășești (Sălaj), a tributary of the Sălaj in Maramureș County
 Tămășești, a tributary of the Zam in Hunedoara County